Sara Corrales (born December 27, 1985, in Medellín, Antioquia, Colombia) is a Colombian television actress and singer. She appeared in the 2004 telenovela Todos quieren con Marilyn as Catalina Osorio, a role which won her the TV y Novelas award to the revelation of the year, the 2008 telenovela Vecinos, where she played the evil Jessica, which also earned her a nomination for the favorite villain on the TV y Novelas award in 2009 and El Señor de los Cielos (2013).

Filmography

References

External links 

Colombian television actresses
1985 births
Living people
Colombian telenovela actresses